Plasmodium australis is a parasite of the genus Plasmodium.

Like all Plasmodium species P. australis has both vertebrate and insect hosts. The vertebrate hosts for this parasite are lizards.

Description 

The parasite was first described by Mackerras in 1961 and was designated as Plasmodium giganteum. It was redescribed in 1988 by Telford who recognised it as a separate species.

Geographical occurrence 

This species is found in Australia.

References 

australis